Hallicarnia is a monotypic moth genus in the family Lasiocampidae first described by William Forsell Kirby in 1892. Its only species, Hallicarnia albipectus, was described by Francis Walker in 1855. It is found in

References

Lasiocampidae